Teresa (Katz) Thorne (born April 17, 1954) is an American writer.

Early life and education

T.K Thorne was born on April 17, 1954 in Montgomery, Alabama, the first of three children, to father Warren Katz, a WWII veteran and civilian engineer at the Charleston Naval Shipyard, and mother, Jane Katz, who was inducted into the Alabama Women's Hall of Fame in 2002 for her own achievements. Thorne's grandmother Dorothy Lobman encouraged's Thorne's passion for reading and social reform.

Thorne completed a Masters of Social Work at the University of Alabama.

Career 
In 1977 Thorne was hired as the first Jewish female officer with the Birmingham Police Department. She retired as a captain and assumed an Executive Director position with City Action Partnership (CAP) in Birmingham (a position in which she continues to serve).

Thorne has served as faculty at several writers' conferences and spoken on lecture circuits (including Columbus State University, Colgate University and Wake Forrest University on the Birmingham bombing).

Literary career 
Thorne's novels are reinterpreted stories told from the perspectives of unnamed, briefly-mentioned women of the Bible: the wives of Noah and Lot. They are influenced by archeological findings and academic research as well as Thorne's personal travels.

Thorne carried a monthly column in Birmingham's Synergy Magazine for seven years. She has also written poetry, short stories and screenplays.

Bibliography

Historical fiction 

 Noah's Wife (Chalet Publishing, 2009, Blackburn Fork Publishing, 2011)
 Angels at the Gate (Cappuccino Books, 2015)

Historical nonfiction 

 Last Chance for Justice: How Relentless Investigators Uncovered New Evidence Convicting the Birmingham Church Bombers (Lawrence Books, 2013)

Awards 
A short film developed from her screenplay "Six Blocks Wide" (Shapefilms, 2007) was a semi-finalist at the international A Film for Peace Festival in Italy.

Noah's Wife won Gold in the Historical Fiction category for the 2009 Foreword INDIES.

Personal life 
Thorne currently resides in Springville, Alabama with her husband, two dogs, a cat and a horse.  She is the step-mother of three children, a grandmother of four, and is also a Yondan (4th degree black belt) in Tomiki Ryu Akidio.

References

Living people
1954 births
Writers from Montgomery, Alabama
People from Springville, Alabama
Writers from Birmingham, Alabama